Zeyt-e Olya (also Romanized as Zeyt-e ‘Olyā; also known as Bālā Zeyd and Zeyt-e Bālā) is a village in Miandorud-e Bozorg Rural District, in the Central District of Miandorud County, Mazandaran Province, Iran. At the 2006 census, its population was 908, in 247 families.

References 

Populated places in Miandorud County